Gaye R. Symington (born April 20, 1954) is an American politician who is the former Speaker of the Vermont House of Representatives, the lower house of the Vermont General Assembly. She was the 2008 Democratic nominee for the 2008 Vermont gubernatorial election against incumbent Republican Governor Jim Douglas and Independent Anthony Pollina.

Symington is married to Chuck Lacy, movie producer and former president of Ben and Jerry's ice cream.  The couple have three teenage children. Symington attended Williams College as an undergraduate, and holds a master's degree in business administration from Cornell University in 1983.

Vermont House of Representatives 
First elected to the House in 1996 as a Democrat, Symington represented the Chittenden-8 district until 2009.  As a freshman legislator, she served on the Ways and Means Committee. After the 2002 legislative elections, Symington was elected House Minority Leader in 2003 by her Democratic caucus and led the Vermont Democratic House Campaign (VDHC) in recruitment of Democratic candidates for the House of Representatives in 2004. The Democrats retook the House of Representatives in the 2004 legislative races after four years in the minority.

In January 2005, Symington was unanimously elected Speaker of the House, becoming the second woman to hold the position. In the 2006 elections, the Democratic Party increased its majority in the chamber. There were now enough Democrats, Progressives, and independents in the Vermont House to overturn a gubernatorial veto. Symington won re-election to the post in 2007 without opposition.

2008 Governor campaign 

In 2008, Symington announced she would not seek re-election to the House of Representatives. In May 2008 she announced she would seek the Democratic nomination for Governor of Vermont in the 2008 election against incumbent Republican Jim Douglas and Independent Anthony Pollina. Symington finished third in the election with 69,534 votes for 21.7% of the vote. Symington's campaign was adversely affected when it was discovered she did not fully disclose her family's income. The campaign also failed to capture the endorsements of several major unions, including the state's three largest (State Employees Association, AFL-CIO, and the Vermont's National Education Association affiliate) which endorsed Pollina.

See also 
 List of female speakers of legislatures in the United States

References

External links 
Project Vote Smart – Representative Gaye Symington (VT) profile
Follow the Money – Gaye Symington
2006 2004 2002 2000 1998 campaign contributions
2005 Vermont House biographies

1954 births
Living people
Politicians from Boston
Cornell University alumni
Williams College alumni
Speakers of the Vermont House of Representatives
Democratic Party members of the Vermont House of Representatives
Women state legislators in Vermont
20th-century American politicians
20th-century American women politicians
21st-century American politicians
21st-century American women politicians
Candidates in the 2008 United States elections